This is a list of Picket Fences episodes, in the order that they originally aired on CBS. It had four seasons, each consisting of 22 episodes. The series premiered on September 18, 1992.

Series overview

Episodes

Season 1 (1992–93)

Season 2 (1993–94)

Season 3 (1994–95)

Season 4 (1995–96)

References

External links

Episodes
Lists of American comedy-drama television series episodes